Robin Carlisle is a South African politician, a former Member of the Western Cape Provincial Parliament for the Democratic Alliance and Provincial Minister of Transport and Public Works. He retired from political life in 2014.

Carlisle has a long career as a politician and activist behind him. He was a long-standing member of the Democratic Party, the predecessor to the DA, and co-founded ACTSTOP, an organization that opposed forced removals, during the apartheid years.

References

Year of birth missing (living people)
Living people
Democratic Alliance (South Africa) politicians
People from the Western Cape
Members of the Western Cape Provincial Parliament